Albania participated in the Eurovision Song Contest 2006 in Athens, Greece, with the song "Zjarr e ftohtë" performed by Luiz Ejlli. Its selected entry was chosen through the national selection competition Festivali i Këngës organised by Radio Televizioni Shqiptar (RTSH) in December 2005. Due to the non-top 11 result in the previous contest, Albania was drawn to compete in the semi-final of the contest, which took place on 18 May 2006. Performing as number six, the nation was not announced among the top 10 entries of the semi-final and therefore failed to qualify for the grand final, marking Albania's first non-qualification in the contest.

Background 

The country's highest placing in the contest, to this point, had been the seventh place, which it achieved in 2004 with the song "The Image of You" performed by Anjeza Shahini. Albania's national broadcaster, Radio Televizioni Shqiptar (RTSH), has organised Festivali i Këngës since its inauguration in 1962. Since 2003, the winner of the competition has simultaneously won the right to represent Albania in the Eurovision Song Contest.

Before Eurovision

Festivali i Këngës 

RTSH organised the 44th edition of Festivali i Këngës to determine Albania's representative for the Eurovision Song Contest 2006. The competition consisted of two semi-finals on 16 and 17 December, respectively, and the grand final on 18 December 2005. The three live shows were hosted by Albanian singer Soni Malaj and presenter Drini Zeqo.

Competing entries

Shows

Semi-finals 

The semi-finals of Festivali i Këngës took place on 16 December and 17 December 2005, respectively. 17 contestants participated in each semi-final, with the highlighted ones progressing to the grand final.

Final 

The grand final of Festivali i Këngës took place on 18 December 2005. Luiz Ejlli emerged as the winner with "Zjarr e ftohtë" and was simultaneously announced as Albania's representative for the Eurovision Song Contest 2006.

Key:
 Winner
 Second place
 Third place

At Eurovision 

The Eurovision Song Contest 2006 took place at the O.A.C.A. Olympic Indoor Hall in Athens, Greece, and consisted of a semi-final on 18 May and the grand final on 20 May 2006. Due to its non-top 11 result in the 2005 contest, Albania was required to compete in the semi-final. It was set to perform in position six, following  and preceding . At the end of the semi-final, the country was not announced among the top 10 entries and therefore failed to qualify for the final, marking Albania's first non-qualification in the Eurovision Song Contest.

Voting 

The tables below visualise a breakdown of points awarded to Albania in the semi-final of the Eurovision Song Contest 2006, as well as by the country for both the semi-final and grand final.

Points awarded to Albania

Points awarded by Albania

References 

2006
Countries in the Eurovision Song Contest 2006
2005
Eurovision